Buzz Burrell (b. October 1951) is an American ultrarunner, outdoor athlete, and businessman. Burrell began trail running and ultramarathons during the infancy of the sport in America during the late 1960s and early '70s at events such as the Pikes Peak Marathon.

Burrell first gained notoreity for his variety of outdoor accomplishments, especially ultra-endurance events and backcountry travel, which eventually led to his invention of fastest known time concept and associated website with Peter Bakwin. He personally set a wide array of fastest times and first attempts at routes such as the Colorado Trail and John Muir Trail.  In addition to trail running as a USATF Masters Trail Champion, he has set speed records in other outdoor sports such as climbing routes in the Flatirons.

Professionally, Burrell has managed the La Sportiva mountain running team, owned an organic farm, and was a brand director for outdoor clothing and equipment retailer Ultimate Direction.

References 

American male ultramarathon runners
Living people
1951 births
Sportspeople from Michigan
20th-century American people